Jang Min-hyeok (born December 28, 1978) is a South Korean voice actor. In 2006, he started his career by joining Korean Broadcasting System's voice acting division. Two years later, the voice actor won a KBS Radio Drama Award for Best New Voice Actor. After being a freelancer, Jang became popular with his cover of Shia LaBeouf on the Korean dub of Transformers and has recently been known for his role as Sherlock Holmes on the Korean dub of a British television series Sherlock.

Roles

TV animation dubbing 
 Avatar: The Legend of Korra (아바타: 코라의 전설, Korean TV Edition, Nickelodeon Korea) - Mako
 Black Butler (흑집사, Korean TV Edition, Anibox TV) - Drocell Kinds
 Bleach (블리치, Korean TV Edition, Animax)
 Noba
 Renji Abarai
 A Certain Magical Index (어떤 마술의 금서목록, Korean TV Edition, Animax)
 Acqua of the Back
 Etzali
 Mitsuki Unabara
 Cross Game (크로스 게임, Korean TV Edition, EBS)
 Mizuki Asami (named Seung-Ri Cheon on the Korean TV edition)
 Shugo Daimon (named Do-Hoon Nam on the Korean TV edition)
 Fairy Tail (페어리 테일, Korean TV Edition, Champ TV) - Dranbalt/Mest Gryder
 Fish & Chips (피쉬 & 칩스, KBS) - Torpedo
 Gokujō!! Mecha Mote Iinchō (완소! 퍼펙트 반장, Korean TV Edition, Champ TV) - Ushio Toujou (named Woo-Jin Dong on the Korean TV edition)
 Gravity Falls
 Inazuma Eleven GO (썬더 일레븐 GO, Korean TV Edition, JEI TV) - Gōichi Kurumada (named Gang-Il Cha on the Korean TV edition)
 Inuyasha: The Final Act (이누야샤 완결편, Korean TV Edition, Champ TV) - Kaou
 Jewelpet (쥬얼펫, Korean TV Edition, JEI TV) - Seung-Woo Kang
 Jewelpet Twinkle (쥬얼펫 트윙클, Korean TV Edition, Daekyo Kids TV) - Pu-Reum Jeon
 Le Petit Prince (어린 왕자, Korean TV Edition, EBS) - The king on the episode "La Planète du Oiseau-Feu"
 My Friend Haechi (내 친구 해치, SBS) - Chocochip
 Ruler of Nabari (닌자의 왕, Korean TV Edition, Animax) - Kazuhiko Yukimi
 Olly the Little White Van (뛰뛰빵빵 올리, Korean TV Edition, EBS) - Royston
 Toradora! (토라도라!, Korean TV Edition, Animax) - Yūsaku Kitamura
 We Were There (우리들이 있었다, Korean TV Edition, Animax) - Masafumi Takeuchi

Animated movie dubbing

Film dubbing 
 Avatar (아바타, In-Flight Movie Edition) - One of the Na'vis
 Departures (굿바이, Korean TV Edition, KBS) - Tetta Sugimoto as Yamashita
 Harry Potter and the Order of the Phoenix (해리 포터와 불사조 기사단, Korean-dubbed edition in theaters) - Matthew Lewis as Neville Longbottom
 High School Musical (하이 스쿨 뮤지컬, Korean TV Edition, Disney Channel Korea)
 Chris Warren Jr. as Zeke Baylor
 Lucas Grabeel as Ryan Evans
 I Am Love (아이 엠 러브, Korean TV Edition, Channel A) - Mattia Zaccaro as Gianluca Recchi
 Indiana Jones and the Kingdom of the Crystal Skull (인디아나 존스: 크리스탈 해골의 왕국, Korean TV Edition, KBS) - Shia LaBeouf as Henry "Mutt Williams" Jones III
 Iron Man (아이언 맨, Korean TV Edition, KBS) - JARVIS (originally voiced by Paul Bettany)
 Letters to Juliet (레터스 투 줄리엣, Korean TV Edition, KBS) - Chris Egan as Charlie Wyman
 The Lincoln Lawyer (링컨 차를 타는 변호사, Korean TV Edition, KBS)
 Josh Lucas as Ted Minton
 Shea Whigham as DJ Corliss
 New York, I Love You (뉴욕 아이 러브 유, Korean TV Edition, KBS) - Shia LaBeouf as Jacob (on the "Shekhar Kapur" segment)
 Night of the Living Dead 3D (살아 있는 시체들의 밤, Korean TV Edition) - Sid Haig as Gerald Tovar, Jr.
 Ocean's Eleven (오션스 일레븐, Korean TV Edition, KBS) - Topher Grace as himself
 Princess Protection Program (프린세스 구출 대작전, Korean TV Edition, Disney Channel Korea) - Nicholas Braun as Edwin
 Transformers (트랜스포머, Korean TV Edition, KBS) - Shia LaBeouf as Sam Witwicky
 Transformers: Revenge of the Fallen (트랜스포머: 패자의 역습, Korean TV and streaming Edition, KBS and Amazon Prime) - Shia LaBeouf as Sam Witwicky
 The Twilight Saga: Eclipse (이클립스, Korean TV Edition, KBS)
 Cameron Bright as Alec
 Michael Welch as Mike Newton
 Tyson Houseman as Quil Ateara

Foreign soap opera dubbing 
 Cold Case (콜드 케이스, Korean TV Edition, KBS)
 Ashton Holmes as Sean Morgan on the episode "Maternal Instincts"
 Conor Dubin as Benny Rosen on the episode "Disco Inferno"
 Jason Dohring as Dominic LaSalle on the episode "The Plan"
 Patrick Macmanus as Daniel Holtz on the episode "A Time to Hate"
 Doctor Who 2008–10 specials (닥터 후 스페셜, Korean TV Edition, KBS) - David Ames as Nathan on the episode "Planet of the Dead"
 Falling Skies (폴링 스카이, Korean TV Edition, KBS) - Drew Roy as Hal Mason
 Good Luck Charlie (찰리야 부탁해, Korean TV Edition, Disney Channel Korea) - Jason Dolley as PJ Duncan
 Masked Rider Kiva (가면라이더 키바, Korean TV Edition, Champ TV) - Mitsu Murata as Bishop/The Swallowtail Fangire
 Sherlock (셜록, Korean TV Edition, KBS) - Benedict Cumberbatch as Sherlock Holmes
 Spirit Warriors (영혼의 전사들, Korean TV Edition, EBS) - Gilles Geary as Trix
 Three Kingdoms (삼국지, Korean TV Edition, KBS) - Fan Guan as Liu Qi

Video game dubbing 
 Fighters Club (파이터스 클럽) - Jack
 League of Legends (리그 오브 레전드)
 Ryze (The Rogue Mage)
 Wukong (The Monkey King)
 MapleStory (메이플스토리)
 Kaiser
 Magnus
 Wendy's Adventures in Neverland (웬디의 네버랜드) - Starky Gabriel
 Tears of Themis (미해결사건부) - Artem Wing
 Genshin Impact (원신) - Kamisato Ayato
 Afterlife (애프터라이프) - Ghilley

Awards

KBS Radio Drama Awards

See also 
 Korean Broadcasting System

References

External links 
 Jang Min-Hyeok's profile on KBS Voice 
 J.Place: The official fan club of Jang Min-Hyeok 

1978 births
Living people
South Korean male voice actors
Place of birth missing (living people)
21st-century South Korean male actors